= Bertrand de Crombrugghe de Picquendaele =

Belgian politician

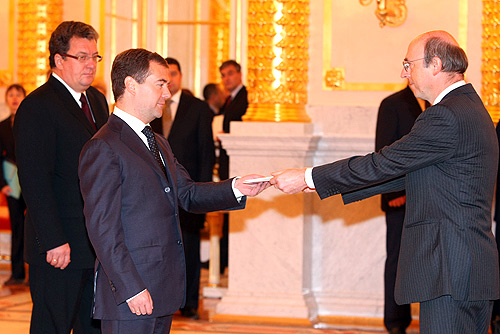
THE KREMLIN, MOSCOW. Ambassador of the Kingdom of Belgium Bertrand de Crombrugghe de Picquendaele presents his letter of credentials to the President of Russia.

Bertrand de Crombrugghe de Picquendaele is the former Ambassador Extraordinary and Plenipotentiary of the Kingdom of Belgium to the Russian Federation.

He is currently the Ambassador of the Kingdom of Belgium to the Democratic Republic of the Congo.
